Airok Airport  is a public use airstrip at Airok on Ailinglaplap Atoll, Marshall Islands.

Airlines and destinations

References

Airports in the Marshall Islands